The Walter Scott Medal for Valor is a medal awarded for acts of bravery by the Garda Síochána.

It is not a state award, being in the gift of the Garda Commissioner.

History

The Garda medal was instituted at the behest of Colonel Walter Scott, a New York City philanthropist who took an interest in policing. In 1923 he gave to the Garda a one thousand dollar gold Bond, which would pay in perpetuity for a gold medal.

The award was to be presented under the following condition:
No action, however heroic, will merit the award of the Scott medal unless it takes the shape of an act of personal bravery, performed intelligently in the execution of duty at imminent risk to the life of the doer, and armed with full previous knowledge of the risk involved.

In 1942, the award condition was amended to most exceptional bravery and heroism involving the risk of life in the execution of duty.

Design

The medal was designed by John F. Maxwell, a Dublin-based teacher who also designed the Garda Síochána crest.
The inscription on the top panel is "The Scott Medal" and on the lower panel "For Valor" (note the American English usage of the word "valour"). On the right and left are the eagle and shield of the United States and the harp and sunburst of Ireland, respectively. The centerpiece is the Garda Crest with the intertwined letters G.S. for Garda Síochána.

The reverse is inscribed "Gharda Síochána na h-Éireann". The four outside panels are the arms of the four provinces of Ireland, Ulster, Munster, Leinster and Connaught.

Notable recipients

 Yvonne Burke
 Deaths of Henry Byrne and John Morley (1980)
 John Martin Cafferky
 John M. G. Cosgrove
 Richard Fallon (1970)
 Jerry McCabe, awarded posthumously after he was shot and killed during a Provisional Irish Republican Army robbery
 Patrick J. Molloy
 Henry L. Smith
 Brian Connaughton

See also

 List of Irish police officers killed in the line of duty

References

Garda Síochána
Orders, decorations, and medals of Ireland
Awards established in 1923
Law enforcement awards and honors